Christophe Riblon (born 17 January 1981) is a French former road and track racing cyclist who competed as a professional for the  team for 13 seasons between 2005 and 2017. He also competed for France at the 2008 Summer Olympics.

Career
Born in Tremblay-en-France, Seine-Saint-Denis, Riblon won two mountain-top finishes of the Tour de France, including stage 14 of the 2010 Tour de France at the ski resort of Ax-3 Domaines in the Pyrenees, and stage 18 of the 2013 Tour de France at Alpe d'Huez.

During his 2010 victory, he was part of the early breakaway that went free  into the race, and he crested the penultimate climb of the day alone, the Port de Pailheres. He had a two-minute lead at the foot of the last climb, and held on to win solo as the general classification contenders were battling it out behind him.

He won his 2013 stage following a long breakaway, chasing down Tejay van Garderen over the second ascent of Alpe d'Huez and holding on to win by a minute, despite crashing into a ditch on the descent of the Col de Sarenne. In doing so he became the race's first (and only) French winner of a stage that year.

Major results

2001
 8th Grand Prix de la ville de Pérenchies
2004
 1st  Road race, National Amateur Road Championships
2005
 2nd Overall Tour de l'Avenir
 8th Tartu GP
 10th Overall Tour du Poitou-Charentes
2006
 5th GP Plumelec-Morbihan
 7th Overall Circuit de Lorraine
1st Stage 4
2007
 1st Tour de la Somme
 2nd Duo Normand (with Émilien-Benoît Bergès)
2008
 2nd  Points race, UCI Track World Championships
2009
 1st Stage 3 Route du Sud
 6th Clásica de San Sebastián
2010
 1st Stage 14 Tour de France
 1st Les Boucles du Sud Ardèche
 2nd  Madison (with Morgan Kneisky), UCI Track World Championships
 5th Overall Circuit de la Sarthe
 5th Overall Bayern-Rundfahrt
 7th Overall Critérium du Dauphiné
2011
 2nd Time trial, National Road Championships
 7th Tour du Doubs
 8th Overall Tour de Pologne
 10th Overall Tour du Poitou-Charentes
2012
 9th Overall Tirreno–Adriatico
 9th Les Boucles du Sud Ardèche
 10th Overall Critérium International
2013
 Tour de France
1st Stage 18
 Combativity award Stage 18 & Overall
 3rd Overall Tour de Pologne
1st Stage 2
2014
 4th Overall Tour de Pologne
2015
 7th Overall Tour de Pologne

Grand Tour general classification results timeline

Other major stage races

References

External links 

 Profile at AG2R Prévoyance official website
 
 
 
 
 

1981 births
Living people
People from Tremblay-en-France
French male cyclists
Cyclists at the 2008 Summer Olympics
Olympic cyclists of France
French Tour de France stage winners
2013 Tour de France stage winners
2010 Tour de France stage winners
French track cyclists
Sportspeople from Seine-Saint-Denis
Cyclists from Île-de-France